Martin Allen (19 October 1964 – probably before or in 1998) is a British teenager who mysteriously disappeared on 5 November 1979. No trace of Allen has been found and his fate remains unknown.

Background
Martin Allen and his brothers grew up in a council flat in Hornsey, where their mother was a secretary at Tufnell Park Primary School. When Martin was aged 12, his father Tom gained employment as a chauffeur to the Australian High Commissioner and the whole family moved to a cottage in the grounds of the Australian High Commission in Kensington. This was a significant change in the Allen family's socioeconomic circumstance, and their new neighbours included the De Beers jewellery family. Margaret Thatcher and Edward Heath were regular visitors to the High Commission and Thatcher had a passing acquaintance with Allen's father.

Allen attended the Central Foundation Grammar School in Old Street and was described as intelligent, good at French, maths and drawing. Allen was a shy boy, looked young for his age, and not the type to run away from home.

Disappearance
On 5 November 1979, Allen travelled home from school on the London Underground. His intention was to go to see his older brother, Bob, who lived near Holloway Road, but he needed to go home first in order to collect some money. At around 3:50 pm, he said goodbye to some school friends at King's Cross station and set off in the direction of the Piccadilly line platform to travel home. Initial reports state that this was the last confirmed sighting of Allen. Later reports state that he came home around 5 pm as witnessed by his brother, Kevin, but went straight out again. 

Allen failed to reach Bob's residence. The family were not alarmed that he did not return home that night, as they assumed that he had stayed with Bob when it got too late. After having spent the following day not hearing any word from Allen, his mother rang Bob at 7 pm; he had thought Martin had gone home due to fireworks from Guy Fawkes Day celebrations. The parents phoned Allen's best friend, Robert, who told them Martin had not been at school. The parents then called the Metropolitan Police.

Initial investigation 
When Allen was reported missing, a large-scale police operation was launched supported by a media campaign; this failed to locate him. The police searched Allen's bedroom in the family cottage for nine hours but did not find any fingerprints.

After a televised appeal five weeks after Allen's disappearance, a male witness came forward to report seeing a man accompanying a boy acting suspiciously at Gloucester Road station at 4:15 pm, about half an hour after Martin vanished. The witness reported that the man was standing with his arm around the shoulder of the boy, who resembled Allen. The boy appeared distressed and both parties appeared to be nervous as they got onto a train. The witness saw the man prod the boy in the back, and overheard him telling the boy not to try to run when the pair left the train at Earl's Court station. The witness described the man as six feet tall, in his thirties, well built, with very blonde hair and moustache, and wearing a denim jacket and trousers.

The effort to identify the man was described at the time as London's biggest ever house-to-house search. It included a visit to every property in Earl's Court, the publication of an artist's impression and the wide circulation of Identikit pictures. Investigators eliminated 200 possible suspects, spoke to 50,000 people and collected 600 statements during the inquiry. The identity of the man was never discovered.

Allen's brother Jeffrey alleged that in the early stages of the police investigation, the detective in charge had told the Allen family that there were "high-up people involved" and that they should stop talking and "not take it further because someone will get hurt".

Subsequent events
In 1998 it was reported that police in Liverpool, acting on an anonymous tip off, had discovered a "shrine" dedicated to Allen at the home of an alleged paedophile. This bizarre development prompted a brief resurgence of interest in the case, but no new leads were forthcoming.

In 2009, police told Allen's brothers Kevin and Jeffrey that the files on the investigation had been destroyed in a flood. That same year, Allen's parents conceded they had no hope of seeing him alive again, believing him to have been abducted; they stated their wish simply to know what had happened and why. Tom Allen died in 2012.

Subsequent investigations
After having been closed in the 1980s, the Allen case was reopened in 2009 in light of new information. The officer leading the revived investigation admitted that police were baffled by the case and that, despite a massive initial inquiry and a good response from the public, they had few leads. Police interviewed imprisoned serial killer Dennis Nilsen twice about Martin's disappearance; no evidence of a connection was found.

In 2012, police initiated a number of new investigations into child abuse allegations dating back over the previous thirty years. This included a re-investigation of claims of systemic child abuse by an alleged pedophile ring at Elm Guest House during the 1970s and 1980s. The location of Elm Guest House, along with the alleged activities of the individuals involved there, have led to media speculation that Allen and Vishal Mehrotra were abused and murdered by paedophiles operating there.

In 2015, Operation Midland officers interviewed Carl Beech, then known publicly under the pseudonym "Nick", who falsely claimed that he saw three boys being murdered by the paedophile ring: one was run over, another strangled by a Conservative MP and the third killed in front of a government minister. Beech told police that former Conservative MP Harvey Proctor had been responsible for two of the murders and had been implicated in the third. Proctor denied all allegations and did not recognise an E-FIT photograph of the boy when questioned. The allegations were eventually proved false and Beech was proved to be a fantasist. He was convicted of crimes related to lying to police in July 2019 and was jailed for eighteen years.

In April 2015, it was announced by the police that some of the lost evidence had been rediscovered. In May 2016, Operation Malswick superseded Operation Midland and was formed specifically to re-investigate Allen's case. Police questioned Sidney Cooke, a paedophile gang leader who was jailed for life in 1985.

See also
 List of people who disappeared
 Murder of Lindsay Rimer, unsolved 1994 case of a British child who disappeared from Yorkshire and was found a year later in a nearby canal
 Disappearance of Suzy Lamplugh, one of Britain's most famous unsolved disappearance cases

References

1979 in London
1970s missing person cases
London Underground
Missing English children
Missing person cases in London
Unsolved murders in England
Possibly living people
Unsolved crimes in England
Kidnappings in England
Incidents of violence against boys